The 1990–91 season was Port Vale's 79th season of football in the English Football League, and second successive (34th overall) season in the Second Division. For the first time since 1926–27 they played in a league above rivals Stoke City. Vale finished in mid-table, exiting the FA Cup at the Fourth Round, the League Cup at the Second Round, and the Full Members' Cup at the First Round. John Rudge continued to uncover hidden 'gems', signing Dutchman Robin van der Laan for £80,000. Darren Beckford was top-scorer once again, though the club's Player of the Year award went to Ray Walker.

Overview

Second Division
The pre-season saw John Rudge follow up a recommendation by signing young Irish forward Derek Swan from Bohemians for £15,000. Meanwhile, more than £250,000 was taken in by the club from season-ticket sales. Much of this went on improving Vale Park, with 3,750 yellow and white seats fitted in the Railway Paddock, and 1,121 seats added to the upper tier of the Bycars End. The Bycars End roof was removed for safety reasons, whilst a police box was constructed between the Railway Paddock and the Hamil End. Admission rates increased to £5 for a terrace place, £6 for a seat in the Paddock and £7 in the stand. Season tickets ranged between £75 and £105. With police bills set to spiral upwards, a record five-figure shirt sponsorship deal was struck with Kalamazoo (a business systems company). A 25,000 seater stadium was planned for Festival Park, however Chairman Bill Bell was 'frightened to death by the cost', and the plans were binned.

The season opened with two defeats, though a 2–0 win over Leicester City on 1 September kick-started the Vale's campaign. A week later they beat Portsmouth 4–2 at Fratton Park. However their 3–2 win over Middlesbrough was followed by seven league games without a win. Left-back Colin Gibson scored on his debut, having arrived on loan from Manchester United; whilst future-Nigerian international Reuben Agboola also arrived on loan from Sunderland. The streak ended when Ray Walker and Darren Beckford found their scoring form, firing the club to five victories in seven games, including a 5–1 home win over Plymouth Argyle. The Vale lost their form around Christmastime however, and they remained in indifferent form until the end of the season. Rudge took in Nick Platnauer on loan from Notts County, though results failed to pick up.

In February, Ronnie Jepson was sold to Preston North End for £80,000, having previously been loaned out to Peterborough United. Gary West also spent much of the season away from Vale Park, spending time on loan at Gillingham and Lincoln City (signing permanently for Lincoln at the end of the season for a £25,000 fee). All of the money raised from Jepson's sale went on bringing Dutchman Robin van der Laan to Burslem from Wageningen. Right-back Paul West also arrived for a £3,800 fee from non-league Alcester Town. In March, Gary Ford and £80,000 were traded to Mansfield Town in exchange for Kevin Kent. Also of note during this spell was a hat-trick for Beckford in a 3–0 win over Blackburn Rovers on 9 March, and a run of four goals in the final four games for Robbie Earle. Striker Brian Mills made his debut in a final day win over Swindon Town, and would later be picked for the England squad for the 1991 FIFA World Youth Championship.

They finished in fifteenth place with 57 points, twelve points away from Middlesbrough in the play-offs, but nine points clear of relegated West Bromwich Albion. Beckford scored 23 goals in all competitions, whilst Earle contributed twelve goals.

Finances
The club's shirt sponsors were Kalamazoo.

Cup competitions
In the FA Cup, Vale advanced into the Fourth Round with a 2–1 victory over Fourth Division Peterborough United. There they lost at home to First Division Manchester City in front of a season-high crowd of 19,132.

In the League Cup, the "Valiants" faced Oxford United. A 2–0 defeat on the home leg meant they were eliminated after a goalless draw at the Manor Ground.

In the short-lived Full Members' Cup, Vale lost 1–0 to Notts County at Meadow Lane to exit the competition at the first stage.

League table

Results
Port Vale's score comes first

Football League Second Division

Results by matchday

Matches

FA Cup

League Cup

Full Members' Cup

Player statistics

Appearances

Top scorers

Transfers

Transfers in

Transfers out

Loans in

Loans out

References
Specific

General

Port Vale F.C. seasons
Port Vale